Takayama (written: 高山 lit. "high mountain") is a Japanese surname. Notable people with the surname include:

Takayama Ukon (1552–1615), Daimyō, baptized as a member of the Society of Jesus
Takayama Chogyū (1871–1902), Japanese writer
Haneko Takayama (born 1975), Japanese writer
Hiroshi Takayama (born 1956), Japanese historian
Kazumi Takayama (born 1994), Japanese idol and writer
Kiyoshi Takayama (born 1947) Yakuza
Leila A. Takayama, human–computer interaction specialist
Masataka Takayama (disambiguation), multiple people
Minami Takayama (born 1964) Japanese voice actress-singer
Yoshihiro Takayama (born 1966) Professional Wrestler
Cyril Takayama  (born 1973) illusionist of Okinawan-Japanese and Moroccan-French descent
Katsunari Takayama (born 1983) Former Minimumweight Boxing World Champion
, Japanese footballer

Japanese-language surnames